Folke Lennart Roland Dahlgren (born 4 May 1952) is a retired Swedish heavyweight weightlifter. He placed 11th at the 1976 Olympics and sixth at the 1977 and 1978 world championships.

References

External links
 

1952 births
Living people
Swedish male weightlifters
Olympic weightlifters of Sweden
Weightlifters at the 1976 Summer Olympics
Sportspeople from Stockholm
20th-century Swedish people